The Crown Inn is a public house at 142 Victoria Street, Glossop, Derbyshire SK13 8JF.

It is on the Campaign for Real Ale's National Inventory of Historic Pub Interiors.

It was built in the 1840s.

References

National Inventory Pubs
Pubs in Derbyshire
Glossop